Teichmüller is a German surname (German for pond miller) and may refer to:
 Anna Teichmüller (1861–1940), German composer
 :de:Frank Teichmüller (19?? – now), former German IG Metall district manager "coast"
 Gustav Teichmüller (1832–1888), German philosopher
 :de:Marlies Teichmüller (1914–2000), German geologist
 (Paul Julius) Oswald Teichmüller (1913–1943), German  mathematician
 Robert Teichmüller (1863–1939), pianist and professor
 :de:Rolf Teichmüller (1904–1983), German geologist

See also 
 Teichmüller space
 Inter-universal Teichmüller theory

German-language surnames